State Route 348 (SR 348) is an east–west state highway in the south central portion of the U.S. state of Ohio.

History
SR 348 was commissioned in 1935, routed on its current route, with the eastern terminus at its intersection with SR 73 in Otway. In 1939 the route was extended east to U.S. Route 23, near Lucasville. A section of SR 348 from Otway to Lucasville was originally designated a part of Corridor B on the Appalachian Development Highway System. Only a section from U.S. Route 23 to west of SR 104 was ever completed.

Major intersections

References

348
Transportation in Adams County, Ohio
Transportation in Scioto County, Ohio